Saif Al-Din Al-Rawi  (born 1949) was commander of the Republican Guard under the rule of Saddam Hussein. 
He is the Jack of Clubs in the deck of most-wanted Iraqi playing cards.

Saif Al-Din is still at large.

References

1949 births
Living people
Military leaders of the Iraq War
Most-wanted Iraqi playing cards